Michelle Sank (born 1953) is a South African photographer. She left South Africa in 1978 and has lived in Exeter, in the South West England, since 1987.

Her work is included in the collection of the Museum of Fine Arts Houston, the Center for Photography at Woodstock and the Royal Albert Memorial Museum.

References

Living people
1953 births
20th-century photographers
21st-century photographers
20th-century South African women artists
21st-century South African women artists